Trend line can refer to:

 A linear regression in statistics
 The result of trend estimation in statistics
 Trend line (technical analysis), a tool in technical analysis